Thinle Lhondup, also known as Thinley or Thinlen (1943/44 – April 24, 2016), was a popular Nepalese actor from Dolpa, Nepal. He is best known for his role as the elderly-community leader named Tinle in Himalaya, a 1999 adventure film directed by Éric Valli, a French film director. The film was nominated in the Best Foreign Film category at the 72nd Academy Awards. He also appeared in some Nepali music videos, including the popular "Sa Karnali" by the Nepali band Nepathya.

Thinle died on April 24, 2016 in Dolpa, Nepal after falling from the trail whilst riding a horse, aged 72. He had also been suffering from stomach cancer for which he took treatment at Kathmandu.

References

External links

1940s births
2016 deaths
20th-century Nepalese male actors
Nepalese male film actors
Nepalese people of Tibetan descent
People from Dolpa District
Deaths by horse-riding accident